The 2022 Mississippi Valley State Delta Devils football team represented Mississippi Valley State University as a member of the East Division of the Southwestern Athletic Conference (SWAC) during the 2022 NCAA Division I FCS football season. Led by fifth-year head coach Vincent Dancy, the Delta Devils played their home games at Rice–Totten Stadium in Itta Bena, Mississippi.

Previous season

The Delta Devils finished the 2021 season with a record of 4–7, 3–5 SWAC play to finish in a tie for fourth place in the East Division.

Schedule

Games summaries

at Tarleton State

at Austin Peay

Delta State

No. 11 Jackson State

at Florida A&M

Alcorn State

at Alabama State

Bethune–Cookman

Alabama A&M

at Southern

Prairie View A&M

References

Mississippi Valley State
Mississippi Valley State Delta Devils football seasons
Mississippi Valley State Delta Devils football